Jules Robert Auguste (1789 – 15 April 1850) was a French painter associated with Romanticism and classicism.

19th-century French painters
French male painters
1789 births
1850 deaths
19th-century French male artists
18th-century French male artists